Jeong Kyeong-doo (born 13 September 1960) is the 46th Minister of National Defense of South Korea. He was a former fighter pilot and General of the Republic of Korea Air Force serving as Chairman of the Joint Chiefs of Staff and the Air Force Chief of Staff.

Early life and education 
Jeong was born on September 13, 1960, in Jinju, South Korea. He graduated from Daea High School in 1978. Jeong graduated from the Korea Air Force Academy in 1982. He studied at the Air Command and Staff Course (in 1995) and the Air War Course (in 2005) of the Japan Air Self-Defense Force (JASDF), Jeong also has a MA in Management of the Graduate School of Business, Hannam University in 2002.

Career 
Jeong received his commission from the Air Force Academy in 1982. In 2004, he was promoted to Colonel, serving as Chief of the Force Requirement Division at the Air Force HQ from 2006 to 2008, and Cadets Group Commander, Air Force Academy from 2008 to 2009. After his promotion to brigadier general in 2009, he was made Commander of the 1st Fighter Wing in Gwangju Air Base (2009-2011). Other major assignments including Commander, Force Service Support Group-Gyeryongdae (2011), Deputy Chief of Staff (A-5) of the Air Force HQ (2011-2013), Commander of the Southern Combat Command (2013-2014), Vice Chief of Staff of the Air Force (2014-2015), Chief Director (J-5) of the Joint Chiefs of Staff (2015) before promoted to four-star rank to serve as the Air Force Chief of Staff in 2015.

Upon the beginning of Moon Jae-in's presidency in 2017, Jeong was appointed as chairman of Joint Chiefs of Staff - the second air force background to assume such post. In 2018 he was promoted to as Moon's second defense minister.

Controversy 

The "Republic of Korea Guardian Reserve Forces", a newly formed group of Korean Armed Forces retired generals and reservists led by General Paik Sun-yup, which its members included three former defense ministers, a former chief of the South Korean joint chiefs of staff, and commanders of the navy and marines, oppose the Sept. 19 agreement of President Moon Jae-in due to the engagement with North Korea has gone too far. The group of retired generals condemned Defense Minister Jeong Kyeong-doo for "pandering to politicians".

Religion  
Jeong follows the Protestantism religion.

Effective dates of promotion

References

|-

|-

External links
 

1960 births
Living people
People from Jinju
Korea Air Force Academy alumni
Hannam University alumni
Chiefs of Staff of the Air Force (South Korea)
Chairmen of the Joint Chiefs of Staff (South Korea)
National Defense ministers of South Korea